The Colgate–Syracuse football rivalry is an American college football rivalry between the Colgate Raiders and Syracuse Orange. The two schools are located 38 miles apart from each other in Central New York. The two teams have met 67 times, and despite Colgate not recording a victory since 1950, the series is tied 31–31–5. The game has been infrequently played since the NCAA's divisional split in 1978, which placed Colgate in Division I-AA and Syracuse in Division I-A.

History
Colgate University (located in Madison County) and Syracuse University (located in neighboring Onondaga County) are both private institutions, and their close proximity to each other quickly lead to a natural rivalry in athletics between the two schools. Colgate and Syracuse first played each other in football in 1891, with Colgate recording a 22–16 victory. The Red Raiders would go on the win 12 of the first 16 games in the series. Colgate's early dominance in the series quickly gave rise to the legend of the Hoodoo (a play on a corruption of the word Voodoo). The Hoodoo legend was based on a story that, during the construction of Syracuse's Archbold Stadium in 1907, a Colgate student snuck onto the construction site and buried a varsity maroon "C" sweater in the drying cement, thereby cursing Syracuse to failure against the Red Raiders. Colgate students even went so far as to rent planes to drop "Hoodoo" flyers to litter the Syracuse campus, prompting Syracuse students to respond by dropping their own flyers on the Colgate campus. After Syracuse students upped the ante by pouring orange dye into Colgate's Taylor Lake, Colgate students responded by renting a plane to drop red paint onto Archbold Stadium. 

By the late 1950s, Syracuse had established itself as a major power in Eastern college football, while Colgate continued to lag behind and the games became increasingly one-sided. Following the 1961 contest, Colgate terminated the series, in order to focus on playing smaller, peer institutions. Following the NCAA's I-A/I-AA split in 1978, the rivalry was intermittently renewed in the 1980s, with Syracuse comfortably winning all three games played in the decade. In 2010, the rivalry was renewed again after a 23-year absence, with Syracuse recording a 42–7 victory. The series resumed again in 2016, when Syracuse hosted Colgate in a game played in the Carrier Dome, which Syracuse won 33–7. The series was scheduled to resume in 2020, but was canceled due to the COVID-19 pandemic .

Notable games
1891: The first ever meeting between the two schools resulted in a 22–16 Colgate victory.
1897 – The Tackle: Colgate was hosting the game in Hamilton. With the game tied, a Colgate alumnus who was working as a newspaper reporter covering the game, ran out onto the field and tackled a Syracuse player who had broken away and was about to score the go-ahead touchdown. The game eventually ended in a 6–6 tie. The series would be suspended until 1902, at which point every subsequent game in the series would be played in Syracuse.
1916: Colgate defeats Syracuse 15–0 en route to the program's first national championship season.
1932: Colgate went into Archbold Stadium and shut out the Orangemen 16–0 en route to a perfect season and the program's second national championship season.
1950 – Colgate's Last Stand: Colgate pulls out a 19–14 victory over Syracuse in Archbold Stadium, Colgate's last victory in the series to date.
1956: Jim Brown scores an NCAA-record 43 points in Syracuse's 61–7 victory over Colgate.
1959: #1 ranked Syracuse hosted Colgate in front of 31,000 fans at Archbold Stadium and dominated the Red Raiders 71–0 en route to a perfect season and only national championship season to date.
1961 – The End: Syracuse records a 51–8 victory over Colgate in the last regularly scheduled annual meeting between the two schools. Colgate and Syracuse would not play again in football for the next 20 years.
2010: Colgate and Syracuse met on the gridiron for the first time since 1987, a 42–7 Syracuse victory in the Carrier Dome.

Game results

See also  
 List of NCAA college football rivalry games

References

College football rivalries in the United States
Colgate Raiders football
Syracuse Orange football
1891 establishments in New York (state)